"I'm a Ramblin' Man" is a song written by Ray Pennington. He recorded the song in 1967 for Capitol Records and took it to number 29 on the country charts.

It was later recorded by American country music artist Waylon Jennings.  The song was Jennings' second number one on the country chart and stayed at number one for a single week. "I'm a Ramblin' Man" also appeared on the Australian charts.

Content 
The song is a warning to beware ramblers.

Chart performance

Ray Pennington

Waylon Jennings

References

1967 singles
1974 singles
Ray Pennington songs
Waylon Jennings songs
Songs written by Ray Pennington
Songs about Chicago
RCA Records Nashville singles
1967 songs